Mondelez International, Inc., styled as Mondelēz International, is an American multinational confectionery, food, holding and beverage and snack food company based in Chicago. Mondelez has an annual revenue of about $26 billion and operates in approximately 160 countries. It ranked No. 108 in the 2021 Fortune 500 list of the largest United States corporations by total revenue.

The company has its origins as Kraft Foods Inc., which was founded in Chicago in 1923. The present enterprise was established in 2012 when Kraft Foods was renamed Mondelez and retained its snack food business, while its grocery business was spun off to a new company called Kraft Foods Group. The name is derived from the Latin word  ("world") and delez, a fanciful modification of the word "delicious."

The Mondelez International company manufactures chocolate, cookies, biscuits, gum, confectionery, and powdered beverages. Mondelez International's portfolio includes several billion-dollar components, among them cookie and cracker brands Belvita, Chips Ahoy!, Oreo, Ritz, TUC, Triscuit, LU, Club Social, Sour Patch Kids, Barny, and Peek Freans; chocolate brands Milka, Côte d'Or, Toblerone, Cadbury, Green & Black's, Freia, Marabou, Fry's, Lacta, and Alpen Gold; gum and cough drop brands Trident, Dentyne, Chiclets, Halls, and Stride; as well as Tate's Bake Shop cookies and powdered beverage brand Tang.

Mondelez Canada holds the rights to Christie Brown and Company, which consists of brands such as Mr. Christie, Triscuits, and Dad's Cookies. Its head office is in Mississauga, Ontario, with operations in Toronto, Hamilton, Ontario and Montreal, Quebec.

History

Before Mondelez International

Mondelez International is rooted in the National Dairy Products Corporation (National Dairy), which was founded on December 10, 1923, by Thomas H. McInnerney and Edward E. Rieck. The firm was initially set up to execute on a rollup strategy in the fragmented United States ice cream industry.

In 1924, Kraft Cheese Company was founded and was listed on the Chicago Stock Exchange. Two years later, it was listed on the New York Stock Exchange. In 1928, it acquired Phenix Cheese Company, the maker of a cream cheese branded as Philadelphia Cream Cheese, founded by Jason F. Whitney Sr. and the company changed its name to Kraft-Phenix Cheese Company.

In 1930, National Dairy acquired Kraft Phenix. After the acquisition, the combined company retained the National Dairy name and management, though the Kraft Phenix side of the company continued to operate largely independently.

On September 7, 2009, Kraft made a hostile £10.2 billion takeover bid for the British confectionery group Cadbury, makers of Dairy Milk and Bournville chocolate. On November 9 the company's bid (then £9.8 billion) was rejected by Cadbury, which called it a "derisory" offer. Kraft upped its offer on December 4. It had significant political and public opposition in the United Kingdom and abroad, leading to a call for the government to implement economic protectionism in large-company takeovers. On January 19, 2010, Cadbury approved a revised offer from Kraft which valued the company at £11.5 billion ($19.5 billion). Some funds for the takeover were provided by the Royal Bank of Scotland, the partially state-owned British bank.

Cadbury sales were flat after Kraft's acquisition. Despite the Cadbury takeover helping to boost overall sales by 30 percent, Kraft's net profit for the fourth quarter fell 24 percent (to $540 million) due to costs associated with integrating the UK business after the acquisition. Kraft spent $1.3 billion on integration to achieve an estimated $675 million in annual savings by the end of 2012. Kraft increased prices to offset rising commodity costs for corn, sugar, and cocoa in North America and Europe. According to Rosenfeld, "We expect it will remain weak for the foreseeable future." Taking into account integration costs, the acquisition reduced Kraft's earnings per share by about 33% immediately after the Cadbury purchase.

Creation of Mondelēz International

In August 2011, Kraft Foods announced plans to split into two publicly traded companies, an international snack-food company and a North American grocery company.

The snack-food company, called Mondelez International, would be the legal successor of the old Kraft Foods, while the grocery company would be a new company, Kraft Foods Group. The split was completed in October 2012. It was structured so that Kraft Foods changed its name to Mondelez International and spun off Kraft Foods Group as a new publicly traded company. Kraft Foods Group later merged with Heinz to become Kraft Heinz.

In 2014, the company announced a merger of its coffee business with the Dutch firm Douwe Egberts. The name of the newly merged company would be Jacobs Douwe Egberts. The merger was confirmed on May 6, 2014, and completed on July 2, 2015.

On June 30, 2016, Mondelez made a $23 billion offer to buy its smaller rival, Hershey. The half-cash, half-stock deal valued Hershey stock at $107 a share. Hershey's board, however, unanimously rejected the offer.

In August 2017, it was announced that Dirk Van de Put, Belgian CEO of McCain Foods, would succeed Irene Rosenfeld as CEO in November 2017.

On May 6, 2018, Mondelez agreed to buy cookie maker Tate's Bake Shop for approximately $500 million. The acquisition was completed on June 7, 2018.

On June 19, 2019, Mondelez agreed to acquire a majority interest in Perfect Snacks, owner of refrigerated protein bar Perfect Bar. The acquisition was completed on July 16.

On February 25, 2020, Mondelez announced that it was acquiring a majority stake in Toronto-based Give & Go, a maker of two-bite brownies. The acquisition was completed on April 3, 2020.

In January 2021, Mondelez announced that it had bought Hu Master Holdings for more than $250 million.

On May 26, 2021, Mondelez announced an agreement to acquire Greek snack company Chipita S.A., a high-growth key player in the Central and Eastern European croissants and baked snacks category. On January 3, 2022, Mondelez announced that the acquisition is complete.

In May 2022, it was announced Mondelez had acquired Grupo Bimbo's confectionery business, Ricolino, for approximately US$1.3 billion.

On May 10, 2022, Mondelez announced that it would sell its gum business, including Trident and Dentyne, in developed markets including North America and parts of Europe, as well as the entire Halls cough drop business.

In June 2022, Mondelez announced that it would be acquiring Clif Bar for $2.9 billion. Through the acquisition, Mondelez will obtain Clif, Luna, and Clif Bar Kids as a part of its portfolio.

On December 19, 2022, Mondelez announced that it was selling its gum business, including the Trident, Dentyne, Chiclets and Stride brands, to Perfetti Van Melle, the makers of Mentos. The deal is expected to close in the fourth quarter of 2023.

Corporate affairs 
The headquarters are in Fulton Market, Chicago. Previously they were in Deerfield, Illinois. In 2020 the company announced that the headquarters were moving to Chicago.

Finances 
For the fiscal year 2017, Mondelēz International reported earnings of US$2.922 billion, with an annual revenue of US$25.896 billion, a decline of 0.1% over the previous fiscal cycle. Mondelēz International's shares traded at over $42 per share, and its market capitalization was valued at over US$58.8 billion in October 2018. In the first quarter of 2020, due to COVID-19 lockdowns and people stocking up with sweets, the company's sales grew by 15% in North America, increasing its overall revenue by almost 3%.

Controversies

Deforestation 
In September 2017, an investigation conducted by NGO Mighty Earth found that a large amount of the cocoa used in chocolate produced by Mondelez and other major chocolate companies was grown illegally in national parks and other protected areas in Ivory Coast and Ghana. The countries are the world's two largest cocoa producers.

The report documents how in several national parks and other protected areas, 90% or more of the land mass has been converted to cocoa. Less than four percent of Ivory Coast remains densely forested, and the chocolate companies' laissez-faire approach to sourcing has driven extensive deforestation in Ghana as well. In Ivory Coast, deforestation has pushed chimpanzees into just a few small pockets, and reduced the country's elephant population from several hundred thousand to about 200–400. While Mondelez claimed to have mapped almost all of its cocoa suppliers in Côte d'Ivoire, Ghana and Indonesia by 2018 in an effort to combat deforestation. Mondelez received a 'yellow', the second of the four possible ratings on the 2022 Chocolate Scorecard for Agroforestry i.e. 'starting to implement good policies'.

Wheat futures price-fixing allegation
In April 2015, the U.S. Commodity Futures Trading Commission (CFTC) alleged that Mondelez International and its former subsidiary, Mondelez Global, bought $90 million (£61 million) of wheat futures with no intention of taking delivery. According to the CTFC, the purchase raised the price of the commodity and earned the company $5.4 million.

Child slavery 

In 2021, Mondelez International was named in a class action lawsuit filed by eight former child slaves from Mali who allege that the company aided and abetted their enslavement on cocoa plantations in Ivory Coast. The suit accused Mondelez (along with Nestlé, Cargill, Mars, Olam International, The Hershey Company, and Barry Callebaut) of knowingly engaging in forced labor, and the plaintiffs sought damages for unjust enrichment, negligent supervision, and intentional infliction of emotional distress.
As with deforestation, Mondelez is 'starting to implement good policies' according to the 2022 Chocolate Scorecard.  Its Cocoa Life programme for sustainable cocoa aims to address the root causes of child labour with a holistic approach, collaborating with families, encouraging school attendance and monitoring child labour on farms. Cocoa Life farms accounted for 43% of Mondelez' cocoa needs by 2018 and the company planned to have 100% coverage with Cocoa Life by 2025.

Business in Russia 

After the Russian invasion of Ukraine on February 24, 2022, many international companies felt compelled to reduce or end business in the Russian Federation. As of March 12, 2022, Mondelez International was listed in an online spreadsheet by Yale professor Jeffrey Sonnenfeld as being among a minority of companies continuing to do business in Russia, where it generates 3.5% of annual revenue (approximately $1 billion).

References

External links

  

 New York Times article about Mondelez name and rebranding

 
2012 establishments in Illinois
American chocolate companies
American companies established in 2012
Companies listed on the Nasdaq
Confectionery companies of the United States
Corporate spin-offs
Food and drink companies based in Chicago
Food and drink companies established in 2012
Multinational companies headquartered in the United States
Multinational food companies
Snack food manufacturers of the United States